Choroico is a village located in the commune of Cunco in Araucania, southern Chile.

References

Geography of Los Ríos Region
Populated places in Ranco Province